Aber, Ceredigion is a hamlet in the  community of Llanwenog, Ceredigion, Wales. Aber is represented in the Senedd by Elin Jones (Plaid Cymru) and is part of the Ceredigion constituency in the House of Commons.

References

Villages in Ceredigion